Barhani is a town and nagar panchayat in Siddharthnagar District  in Uttar Pradesh state, India. This town also has a railway station on the Gorakhpur-Gonda Broad Gauge line of Indian Railways. It is adjacent to the Nepal border from Krishnanagar.  Nepalese and Indian nationals cross the border with no restrictions; however, there is a customs checkpoint for goods. Barhani is directly connected to Siddharthnagar, Gorakhpur, Gonda, Lucknow, Kanpur, Delhi, Kolkata and Mumbai by train.

Demographics
As of 2011 Indian Census, Barhani Bazar had a total population of 14,492, of which 7,520 were males and 6,972 were females. Population within the age group of 0 to 6 years was 2,363. The total number of literates in Barhani Bazar was 9,283, which constituted 64% of the population with male literacy of 69.2% and female literacy of 58.5%. The effective literacy rate of 7+ population of Barhani Bazar was 76.5%, of which male literacy rate was 82.8% and female literacy rate was 69.8%. The Scheduled Castes and Scheduled Tribes population was 1,278 and 92 respectively. Barhani Bazar had 2109 households in 2011.

See also
Khajuria Sarki

References

Cities and towns in Siddharthnagar district
Transit and customs posts along the India–Nepal border